Food insecurity is an issue affecting many American college students. While hunger in the United States affects all age groups, food insecurity seems to be especially prevalent among students. Studies have found that students of color are disproportionately affected. Students can be especially vulnerable to hunger during their first year, as it may be the first time they've lived away from home. The rising cost of education is another driver of food insecurity among students. Experiencing a period of chronic hunger can impact a student's mental health, and can lead to lower academic performance.  Measures taken to alleviate hunger among students includes the establishment of food pantries in several US universities.

Causes
Students, especially first year students, are "uniquely" vulnerable to food insecurity as they transition from a state of dependency (often being looked after by parents) to autonomy. Additionally, the costs involved with higher education have been rising, in some cases faster than peoples ability to pay.

When entering college, many students are leaving their homes and managing their own finances for the very first time in their lives.  Depending on where they go to school, there may be limited access to affordable and nutritious food, such as in food deserts, making students particularly vulnerable to food insecurity.  Students are often forced to choose between expensive textbooks and school materials and food, leaving many students hungry.  Hunger can distract students from focusing, leading to decreased academic performance, longer time than usual to graduate, and higher rates of depression.  Furthermore, familial financial hardship, ever-rising costs of tuition and housing, and lack of sufficient financial aid –which can be attributed to recent major cuts in states’ budgets for public universities and lack of federal aid –have made food insecurity an increasingly common experience among college students. In fact, a study on hunger in US colleges that took data from 2006 to 2016 showed that 40% of students experienced food insecurity.

Prevalence
Food insecurity prevalence was found to be 43.5% in a systematic review of food insecurity among US students in higher education.  This prevalence of food insecurity is over twice as high as that reported in United States national households. Data have been collected to estimate prevalence both nationally as well as at specific institutions (two and four year colleges). For example, an Oregon university reported that 59% of their college students experienced food insecurity. where as in a correlational study conducted at the University of Hawaii at Manoa found that 21-24% of their undergraduate students were food-insecure or at risk of food insecurity. Data from a large southwestern university show that 32% of college freshmen, who lived in residence halls, self-reported inconsistent access to food in the past month. According to a 2011 survey of the City University of New York (CUNY) undergraduates, about two in five students reported being food insecure.

Demographics
Studies have examined the demographics of students who may be more likely to be affected by food insecurity. It's been found that students of color are more likely to be affected by food insecurities. Researchers believe that growing rates of food insecurity in college students are due to an increasing population of low-income college students, higher tuition and insufficient financial assistance. According to a correlational study examining the undergraduate student population from universities in Illinois, African American students were more likely to report being very-low food secure compared to other racial groups. Similarly, the aforementioned study from the University of Hawaii at Manoa found that their undergraduate students, who identified as Hawaiians, Pacific Islanders, Filipinos, and mixed-race, were more likely to be at increased risk of food insecurity compared to Japanese students. In the City University of New York (CUNY), Black and Latino students were 1.5 times more likely to experience food insecurity than White and Asian students. Being a first generation student is another demographic that has been related to increased risk of food insecurity. Other demographics that have been found to increase risk of food insecurity in college students include receiving financial aid, being financially independent, and being employed. Researchers have speculated that students who live at home with their family are less likely to be food insecure, due to spending less on housing expenditures.

Effects

Mental health
College students struggling with access to food are more likely to experience issues with mental health. According to a correlational study examining college freshmen living in residence halls from a large southwestern university, students who were food-insecure, were more likely to self-report higher levels of depression and anxiety, compared to food-secure students. When there isn’t enough food in the body for an extended period amount of time, the student would become fatigued and could experience anxiety, interfering with their concentration in class. It could also lead to lower brain function and can cause emotional distress. When a student is food-insecure, they struggle to have enough money to buy food, leading them to have to settle with unhealthy and improper meals because it’s cheaper. But these meals would probably be highly processed foods which would not only make them physically sick after being consumed for a prolonged amount of time but affect them mentally too.

Academic performance
When a student is unable to focus or has to worry about when their next meal will be or if they have enough money to last for the rest of the week, their academic performance will decline. Food insecurity increases the odds of being in the lower 10% GPA and lower odds of being in the upper 10% GPA. According to a 2018 study on young adults attending an Appalachian University, the GPA of a food-secure student would be on average of 3.51, while a food-insecure student would be 3.33. This could be because the student who has the average lower GPA must spend money on other items or rent instead of buying food and it affects them mentally and physically. The food-insecure students might have to work multiple part-time jobs and not have time to study, unlike the students who are food-secure and have a support system. Additionally, nutrition would affect a student’s thinking skills, behavior, and health. Inadequate nutrients will infer with the student’s learning process, and they will be unable to concentrate, which will affect their academic performance.

Responses

Supplemental Nutritional Assistance Program (SNAP) 
Colleges have taken steps to address the issue of food insecurity on their campuses –such as food pantries and  Supplemental Nutritional Assistance Program (SNAP) application assistance –though commentators have suggested more needs to be done. The  Supplemental Nutritional Assistance Program (SNAP) policies excludes many college students from receiving benefits. SNAP federal policies disproportionately impacts young people and people of color. The Supplemental Nutritional Assistance Program (SNAP) policies excludes many college students from receiving benefits.  This is because when SNAP was first introduced, college students were not the main focus of the program as they were typically from white, middle-class families, under the care of their parents and were young high school graduates without dependents to provide for.  To prevent the system and the benefits from being abused,  students were excluded from enrolling in SNAP.

Food pantries 
Researchers have suggested that college campuses examine available and accessible food-related resources to help alleviate students’ food insecurity. In 2012, the College and University Food Bank Alliance (CUFBA) identified over 70 campuses where food pantries had been implemented or were under development.

Within the younger generations we have seen much grassroots organizing, such as at UC Berkeley's student-run food pantry, established as a non-profit in 2014. This pantry works with the Alameda Food Bank, with UC Berkeley's student farms, with local donations and some purchases to provide a range of nutritious food for students and university staff. The pantry also offers Calfresh application assistance, emergency housing, a basic needs emergency fund, and case management. This thriving free grocery store supports many on campus and teaches young volunteers and interns the value of community resource pooling and offers experience too students in grassroots community leadership. Foods such as cereal, rice, pasta, fruits, vegetables, peanut butter, oils, eggs, milk, soymilk, almond milk, and bread are provided. Furthermore, efforts to meet all culture’s dietary needs have been made. Foods such as tofu and canned bamboo shoots ensure that the food pantry meets the entire community's needs as best as it can as there is a large Asian community that comes through. While the food pantry aims at direct discourse with those in need over what types of food and of what quantity is needed, it understands that clients are not always wanting to have direct conversations. A new app system was created by students in which, upon exiting the food pantry, the items in one’s cart are scanned and entered into the app’s system in order for inventory to be taken. Through survey methods such as this the food pantry is able to assess the direct needs of its participants. But many students are passionate about the conversations that enable the food pantry to best benefit the community, and so the space is created with an overwhelming sense of welcome and respect with a board where students can write on post its for what produce or changes they wish to see in the pantry. The relief that the food pantry offers helps many people make it from one paycheck to another when their funds aren’t enough to cover the board of their needs. The issue with providing direct resource aid is that it creates a band-aid effect. The relief only lasts a certain amount of time until the food has run out. Food pantries specifically engage with social power, as the focus is to work within the community with fellow volunteers to provide for the rest of that very same community. Action that promotes human rights, the right to nutrition.

While food pantries can provide urgent, short-term resources, they are not a sustainable, long-term solution for students.  College food pantries are usually managed by volunteers and have limited budgets and resources; as a result, they do not always have nutritious food available.  Furthermore, although many students are aware of these campus pantries, some may be reluctant to actually use this resource because of the stigma attached to them.  A studied showed that on campuses with food pantries, on average, only about half of the student population know of the pantry and only about one fourth of food-insecure students use the pantry.

See also 

 Economic issues in the United States
 Feeding America
 The Hunger Project
 United States Senate Select Committee on Nutrition and Human Needs

Notes and references

 
Hunger